Willendorf, or when ambiguous Willendorf in der Wachau, is a village in the Wachau valley in Lower Austria.

Willendorf became famous in 1908 when the 30,000 year-old Venus of Willendorf was found there.

Geography 
Willendorf is 209 m above sea level on the left bank of the Danube River, between Aggsbach market and Spitz. The village has 154 inhabitants.

Archaeology 
The Venus of Willendorf was discovered in Willendorf in 1908 and remains the most important Upper Palaeolithic find in Austria. It is around 30,000 years old. Other finds at Willendorf have shown that the site has been occupied for around 50,000 years.

The Venus of Willendorf is part of the permanent exhibition of the Natural History Museum of Vienna.

Economy 
Today, tourism, wine, and the growing of fruit are important parts of the Willendorf economy.

Further reading 
 F. Felgenhauer: Willendorf in der Wachau. Monographie der Paläolithischen Fundstellen. 1956–59.
Archaeological sites in Europe
Archaeological sites in Austria